The Philippines first participated at the Youth Olympic Games at the inaugural 2010 Games. Philippines have participated in every edition of Summer Youth Olympics and two editions of the Winter Youth Olympics, the 2012 and 2020 Games.

Medal table

Medals by Summer Games
*

Medals by sport

Medals by Winter Games

Medals by Mixed-NOCs participation
Mixed-NOCs (IOC code: MIX) are Youth Olympic Games teams consisting of athletes representing different National Olympic Committees (NOCs). The concept of mixed-NOCs was introduced at the 2010 Summer Youth Olympics, in which athletes from different nations would compete in the same team. It was also used in multiple sports at the Winter Youth Olympics since 2012.

Medals by Summer Games

Medals by sport

Medals by Winter Games

Flag bearers

List of medalists

Only Christian Tio of sailing has won a medal credited to the National Olympic Committee of the Philippines, a silver medal. Another medal, a gold medal was won by Luis Gabriel Moreno along with Li Jiaman of China as part of a Mixed-NOCs team. The medal is neither credited to the Philippines or China.

See also
Philippines at the Olympics
Philippines at the Paralympics

References

External links
 Slots in YOG

 
Nations at the Youth Olympic Games